HMS Seawolf was a second-batch S-class submarine built during the 1930s for the Royal Navy. Completed in 1936, the boat fought in the Second World War.

Design and description
The second batch of S-class submarines were designed as slightly improved and enlarged versions of the earlier boats of the class and were intended to operate in the North and Baltic Seas. They displaced  on the surface and  submerged. The S-class submarines had a crew of 40 officers and ratings.

For surface running, the boats were powered by two  diesel engines, each driving one propeller shaft. When submerged each propeller was driven by a  electric motor. They could reach  on the surface and  underwater.

The S-class boats were armed with six 21-inch (533 mm) torpedo tubes in the bow. They carried six reload torpedoes for a total of a dozen torpedoes. They were also armed with a 3-inch (76 mm) deck gun.

Construction and career
Ordered on 15 March 1934, Seawolf was laid down on 25 May 1934 in Scotts Shipbuilding & Engineering's shipyard in Greenock and was launched on 28 November 1935. The boat was completed on 12 March 1936.

Wartime career
Seawolf was a member of the 2nd Submarine Flotilla at the onset of war. From 23–26 August 1939, the 2nd Submarine Flotilla deployed to its wartime bases at Dundee and Blyth.  On 6 October 1939, she attacked the German light cruiser  and the torpedo boat Falke in the Skagerrak, but none of the targets were hit. In April 1940, Seawolf sank the German merchant Hamm, and in November, claimed to have sunk the German merchant Bessheim.  Bessheim was mined and sunk the previous day off Hammerfest, so Seawolf had probably attacked another merchant.

She was one of a number of submarines ordered to track  before her eventual sinking. The German ships had sailed from Trondheim, Norway with the intention of attacking convoy PQ 12.

Seawolf arrived in Halifax, Nova Scotia in 1943 to help the Royal Canadian Navy in anti-submarine warfare training. She was commanded from August 1943 until 23 August 1944 by Commander Denis Woolnough Mills, for whom Seawolf was his first command after being promoted from First Lieutenant of HMS Thunderbolt.

Seawolf was sold for breaking up in November 1945 to Marine Industries, of Montreal.

Citations

References
 
  
 
 
 
 
 

 

British S-class submarines (1931)
Ships built on the River Clyde
1935 ships
World War II submarines of the United Kingdom